Air Vice Marshal Madhavendra Banerji, MVC, VM (4 January 1934 – 17 November 2019) was an ex-officer of the Indian Air Force and a recipient of Maha Vir Chakra, India's second highest gallantry Award and the Vayu Sena Medal.

Early life
Air Vice Marshal Madhavendra Banerji was born on 4 Jan 1934 in Kolkata, India. His father's name was Shri TK Banerji.

Military career
Air Vice Marshal Madhavendra Banerji was commissioned into the Indian Air Force on 16 Apr 1955.
After joining the Indian Air Force, he saw action in both the 1965 and 1971 Indo-Pakistan War.

During the 1971 war, his rank was Squadron Leader and as a senior pilot in the No. 101 Squadron, a fighter bomber squadron equipped with Sukhoi Su-7 aircraft, he led a number of missions against enemy targets, most of them in support of Army operations in the Chhamb battles. During these missions, he destroyed enemy tanks and guns. He was personally responsible for attacks on the enemy and showed bravery and skill by repeatedly returning to the fray in the face of extremely heavy ground fire, which relieved pressure on Indian ground troops and enabled them to press on with their operations. For bravery and leadership displayed in combat missions, Squadron leader Madhavendra Banerji was awarded the Mahavir Chakra.

He later rose to the rank of Air Vice Marshal before retiring. He died on 17 November 2019 due to natural causes at the age of 85.

References

1934 births
2019 deaths
Indian Air Force officers
Indian aviators
Pilots of the Indo-Pakistani War of 1965
Pilots of the Indo-Pakistani War of 1971
Indian military personnel of the Indo-Pakistani War of 1971
Recipients of the Maha Vir Chakra
Recipients of the Vayu Sena Medal
People from Kolkata